The 1983 European Women Basketball Championship, commonly called EuroBasket Women 1983, was the 19th regional championship held by FIBA Europe. The competition was held in Hungary and took place from 11 September to 18 September 1983.  won the gold medal and  the silver medal while  won the bronze.

Squads

First stage

Group A

Group B

Play-off stages

Final standings

External links 
 FIBA Europe profile
 Todor66 profile

 
1983
1983 in Hungarian women's sport
International women's basketball competitions hosted by Hungary
Euro
Sport in Zalaegerszeg
Sport in Miskolc
International sports competitions in Budapest